The Professorship of Greek is a chair at the University of Glasgow. Following a bequest by Douglas MacDowell, the chair was renamed the MacDowell Professor of Greek in his honour.

History
Under the Nova Erectio of King James VI of Scotland the teaching of Greek at the University of Glasgow in Scotland was the responsibility of the Regents (university teachers). From 1581 one of the Regents was sometimes given the title Professor of Greek. The Professorship was more formally established in 1704.

Following the retirement of Douglas MacDowell in 2001, the University opted to let the Chair of Greek lapse. However, upon his MacDowell's death the University received a bequest from his estate of over £2 million. The money was used to re-establish the chair, with the first incumbent of the Macdowell Chair in Greek appointed in 2012.

List of Professors of Greek
The following have held the post:

Professor of Greek
 Alexander Dunlop MA LLD (1704–1746)
 James Moore MA LLD (1746–1774)
 John Young MA (1774–1821)
 Sir Daniel Keyte Sandford MA DCL MP (1821–1838)
 Edmund Law Lushington MA LLD (1838–1875)
 Sir Richard Claverhouse Jebb MA LLD LittD FBA (1875–1889)
 George Gilbert Aime Murray MA FBA (1889–1899)
 John Swinnerton Phillimore MA LLD LittD (1899–1906)
 Gilbert Austin Davies MA (1906–1934)
 William Rennie CBE MA LLD DLitt (1934–1946)
 Arnold Wycombe Gomme MA LLD FBA (1946–1957)
 Donald James Allan MA FBA (1957–1971)
 Douglas Maurice MacDowell MA MLitt DLitt FRSE FBA (1971–2001)

MacDowell Professor of Greek
 Jan Stenger (2012–present)

See also
 List of Professorships at the University of Glasgow

References

1581 establishments in Scotland
Greek, MacDowell
Greek, MacDowell, Glasgow
Greek, MacDowell, Glasgow
Greek-language education